Brother Outsider: The Life of Bayard Rustin is a 2003 American biographical documentary film co-produced and co-directed by Nancy Kates and Bennett Singer. The documentary tells the story of Bayard Rustin, the African-American civil rights activist, notable for his activism for racial equality, gay rights, socialist issues, and organizing the 1963 March on Washington. Appearing in footage and interviews are Rustin, A.J. Muste, David McReynolds, Bob Dylan, Martin Luther King, Malcolm X, Stokely Carmichael, Lyndon B. Johnson and Robert F. Kennedy. The film premiered on January 17, 2003 at the Sundance Film Festival and two days later on January 19 on POV. The film has received numerous awards and nominations at various festivals.

Synopsis
The film relies on interviews, archival film footage, still photographs, and Rustin's own recordings from the 1970s. The film documents his high school days, his move to Harlem in 1937 where he joined Josh White and His Carolinians to support himself, his arrest in 1940 for being a conscientious objector, his association with the Communist Party, and his history as a homosexual, for which he was once arrested on suspicion of being a sexual pervert. It also highlights his time as an advisor to Martin Luther King, Jr., the 1963 March on Washington, and footage of civil rights debates featuring Rustin, Malcolm X and Stokely Carmichael.

Cast
Appearing as themselves

Bayard Rustin  
Dorothy Jackson
John Rodgers
Louis John
Bill Sutherland
A.J. Muste  
George Hauser
Davis Platt
Adam Green
Devi Prasad
Rachelle Horowitz
David McReynolds
Robert Ascher
Michael Thelwell  
Andrew Young

Appearing in archive footage

H. Rap Brown
Stokely Carmichael
Bob Dylan
Mahalia Jackson
Lyndon B. Johnson
Robert F. Kennedy
Martin Luther King
Malcolm X
Charles C. Owen
A. Philip Randolph
Strom Thurmond
Roy Wilkins

Production notes
Bennett Singer said he was worried there wouldn't be enough archival material to use in the film, but they found still photographs and some film footage of Rustin with Gandhi, Lyndon Johnson, Stokely Carmichael and Malcolm X, which they slowed down and used in the documentary. Rustin's partner, Walter Naegle, also gave them access to archival material he possessed. Singer said that Rustin was a talented singer as well, and had actually recorded two albums, and they were able to use his singing in the film as background music. Singer also disclosed that the FBI had monitored him for thirty years, and they tapped his phone after the March on Washington for Jobs and Freedom. Before he died, he requested the files from the FBI and Naegle shared them with Singer.

Reviews
Robert Julian wrote in his review for the Bay Area Reporter that the pace of the film is slow, and he wanted to see more information on his private life and some insight into how he managed to support himself financially through his work as an activist. Sam Adams of the Philadelphia City Paper said that the connection between the public figure and the private man is barely probed in the film and complained that two of his lovers only got about three minutes of screen time. Adams also argued that the extent to which his homosexuality likely motivated his activism, far more than it hindered it, remains unexplored.

Film Threat said in their review that it was a fascinating film, but is a "bit too much of a love fest". However, they did compliment the film for educating audiences about how it was Rustin who organized the famous March on Washington, and then later in life was shunned by Malcolm X for being too "accommodating" and an "insider". Film critic Joe Leydon praised the film's directors for "underscoring Rustin's matter-of-fact courage and self-effacing pragmatism" and also said the pair of directors were "too honest to attempt a canonization of their subject". Leydon said the only flaw he noticed was the "hokey faux-noir" part of the film where an FBI agent was seen typing up reports while ominously describing "incriminating evidence" that the agency possessed against Rustin.

Accolades

See also
 Civil rights movement in popular culture
 List of civil rights leaders
 Timeline of the civil rights movement
 We Shall Overcome

References

Further reading

External links
 
Brother Outsider: The Life of Bayard Rustin at Rotten Tomatoes
Brother Outsider: The Life of Bayard Rustin at BFI
 Brother Outsider: The Life of Bayard Rustin Official website

2003 films
2003 documentary films
2003 LGBT-related films
American documentary films
American LGBT-related films
American films based on actual events
American biographical films
African-American LGBT-related films
African-American films
Cultural depictions of activists
Documentary films about gay men
Films about activists
Gay-related films
Biographical films about LGBT people
2000s English-language films
2000s American films